Rosey Metz (born 14 June 2001) is a Dutch swimmer. She competed in the women's 50 metre breaststroke at the 2019 World Aquatics Championships. She qualified to compete in the semi-finals but she did not qualify to compete in the final.

Personal bests

References

External links
 

2001 births
Living people
Place of birth missing (living people)
Dutch female breaststroke swimmers
21st-century Dutch women